Mark Maclean Coulton (born 3 February 1958) is an Australian politician. He is a member of the National Party and has served in the House of Representatives since the 2007 federal election, representing the Division of Parkes in New South Wales. He has served as Minister for Regional Health, Regional Communications and Local Government (2020–2021), Minister for Regional Services, Decentralisation and Local Government (2019–2020), Assistant Minister for Trade and Investment (2019–2020), Assistant Minister for Trade, Tourism and Investment (2018–2019), and Deputy Speaker of the House (2016–2018).

Early life
Coulton was born in Sydney on 3 February 1958, the son of Jack and Nancy Coulton. He grew up on the family's property in Gravesend, New South Wales. He was educated at Warialda Public School and Farrer Memorial Agricultural High School, where he was a boarder. He returned to the family farm after leaving school and later acquired a property of his own.

Prior to entering parliament, Coulton was involved in various community organisations, including the Warialda Pony Club, the Warialda Rotary Club, and the local Bush Fire Brigade. He served as president of the Warialda Pastoral and Agricultural Association, which organised the local agricultural show. In September 2004, Coulton was elected as the inaugural mayor of Gwydir Shire, a new local government area created from three smaller councils.

Politics
Coulton announced in November 2006 that he would seek National Party preselection for the Division of Parkes. He had previously been the chairman of the party's electoral council for the Division of Gwydir, which was abolished and merged into Parkes. The incumbent Gwydir MP John Anderson was retiring, while the incumbent Parkes MP John Cobb chose to contest the Division of Calare.

Coulton was elected to parliament at the 2007 federal election. He served as a shadow parliamentary secretary from 2007 to 2010, and then as the Nationals' Chief Whip in the House of Representatives from 2010 to 2016. After the 2016 election he was elected Deputy Speaker. He endorsed Michael McCormack for the leadership of the National Party in February 2018, following the resignation of Barnaby Joyce.

Government minister
In March 2018, Coulton resigned as Deputy Speaker to take up the position of Assistant Minister for Trade, Tourism and Investment in the Turnbull Government. He retained the position when Scott Morrison became prime minister in August 2018. In May 2019, following the Morrison Government's re-election at the 2019 election, his title was changed to Assistant Minister for Trade and Investment and he was also given a full ministerial portfolio as Minister for Regional Services, Decentralisation and Local Government. Following a reshuffle in February 2020, he was appointed Minister for Regional Health, Regional Communications and Local Government.

Coulton repeated his endorsement of Michael McCormack for his party's leadership at the February 2020 leadership spill, describing it as an "unfortunate distraction". After McCormack was defeated by Joyce in the 2021 Nationals leadership spill, Joyce stripped Coulton of his ministerial portfolios.

Positions
In November 2020, Coulton stated in a parliamentary speech that Israel was engaged in "a level of apartheid" with regard to Palestinians.

Personal life
Coulton married schoolteacher Robyn Redford in 1981, with whom he had three children.

References

External links

Abbott Government
National Party of Australia members of the Parliament of Australia
Members of the Australian House of Representatives for Parkes
Members of the Australian House of Representatives
1958 births
Living people
People from Tamworth, New South Wales
Turnbull Government
21st-century Australian politicians
Government ministers of Australia
Morrison Government